The 1902–03 international cricket season was from September 1902 to April 1903.

Season overview

October

Australia in South Africa

February

England in New Zealand

March

England in Australia

References

International cricket competitions by season
1902 in cricket
1903 in cricket